Caladenia magnifica, commonly known as the magnificent spider orchid is a species of orchid endemic to Victoria. It has a single leaf and one or two reddish crimson or yellow flowers streaked with crimson and with dark reddish tips. It has not been sighted since 1979 and is presumed to be extinct.

Description 
The sepals and petals have long, dark reddish, thread-like tips. Flowering occurs from September to October.

Taxonomy and naming 
The magnificent spider orchid was first described in 1936 by William Nicholls and given the name Caladenia patersonii var. magnifica and the description was published in The Victorian Naturalist. In 1989 David Jones and Geoffrey Carr raised it to species status. The specific epithet (magnifica) is a Latin word meaning "noble", "eminent" or "splendid".

Distribution and habitat 
The magnificent spider orchid occurs in the Clydesdale district near Guildford in central Victoria where it grows in open forest with a sparse understorey. It has not been seen since 1979 and is presumed to be extinct.

Conservation
Caladenia magnifica is classified as "extinct" under the Victorian Government Flora and Fauna Guarantee Act 1988.

References 

magnifica
Orchids of Victoria (Australia)
Endemic orchids of Australia
Plants described in 1936